Rhynchanthera is a genus of flowering plants belonging to the family Melastomataceae.

Its native range is Mexico to Southern Tropical America.

Species:

Rhynchanthera acuminata 
Rhynchanthera apurensis 
Rhynchanthera brachyrhyncha 
Rhynchanthera bracteata 
Rhynchanthera cordata 
Rhynchanthera dichotoma 
Rhynchanthera gardneri 
Rhynchanthera grandiflora 
Rhynchanthera hassleriana 
Rhynchanthera hispida 
Rhynchanthera latifolia 
Rhynchanthera mexicana 
Rhynchanthera novemnervia 
Rhynchanthera paludicola 
Rhynchanthera rosea 
Rhynchanthera serrulata 
Rhynchanthera ternata 
Rhynchanthera ursina 
Rhynchanthera verbenoides

References

Melastomataceae
Melastomataceae genera